The Ghosts of N-Space is a radio drama based on the long-running British science fiction television series Doctor Who. It was recorded in 1994 and finally broadcast in six parts on BBC Radio 2 from 20 January to 24 February 1996. This was the second Third Doctor radio play, following The Paradise of Death in 1993. Plans for subsequent serials were abandoned after the death of Jon Pertwee in May 1996.

The announcer in the radio serial gave the title as Doctor Who and the Ghosts of N-Space, but both the cassette and CD releases have dropped the "Doctor Who and" prefix in their packaging, as does the novelisation.

It was written by Barry Letts, and featured Jon Pertwee as the Third Doctor, Nicholas Courtney as Brigadier Lethbridge-Stewart and Elisabeth Sladen as Sarah Jane Smith.

The recording was originally released on cassette in 1996, re-released on a three CD set in 2000.

Cast
The Doctor — Jon Pertwee
Brigadier Lethbridge-Stewart — Nicholas Courtney
Sarah Jane Smith — Elisabeth Sladen
Jeremy Fitzoliver — Richard Pearce
Clemenza — Jonathan Tafler
Don Fabrizzio — Don McCorkindale
Max — Stephen Thorne
Nico — David Holt
Maggie — Sandra Dickinson
Mario — Harry Towb
Louisa — Deborah Berlin
Umberto — Peter Yapp
Maid — Joanne Sergeant
Paolo — Paul Brooke
Barone — Gavin Muir
Baronessa / Marcella — Jillie Meers
Roberto — Jonathan Keeble
Guido — Jim Sweeney

Plot
Sarah Jane Smith and her co-worker Jeremy Fitzoliver are on holiday in Sicily when they meet the Brigadier.  The Brigadier is trying to help his Uncle Mario, who is being threatened by a mobster named Vilmio.  Mario is also trying to deal with the ghosts that have been sighted in his castello.  The Brigadier asks the Doctor to investigate the hauntings and determine their source.  The Doctor reveals that the ghosts are "N-Bodies", or the souls of the deceased who have not yet left the physical plane.  The ghosts are gathering around Mario's castello due to a fracture in the N-Space barrier; if the barrier were to fail, Earth would be overrun with the monsters that inhabit N-Space.

The Doctor travels back to the 19th and 16th century in an attempt to locate the cause of the fracture.  In the past he discovers that Vilmio is actually an alchemist called Vilmius who has discovered a method for extending his lifespan; now that he is nearing the end of his life, he wants to use the power of N-Space to give himself true immortality.  He also plans to control the monsters in N-Space and use them to rule the world.  Vilmius has been waiting centuries for a specific astrological conjunction to occur, which is scheduled to occur in the next few days.

Vilmius' men storm the castello, allowing Vilmio access to the N-Space fracture.  The Doctor and Sarah Jane, using a device the Doctor invented, send their N-bodies into the fracture as well.  Inside N-Space, Sarah Jane's belief in the Doctor transforms his body into that of a heroic white knight, which allows the Doctor to defeat Vilmius and sever his N-Body's link with his physical body.  The defeat comes too late, and Vilmius begins absorbing the N-Space energy into his body.  In a last-ditch attempt, the Doctor increases the amount of N-Space energy funnelling into Vilmius, which causes him to explode; the N-Space energy disperses harmlessly.

Continuity
Jeremy Fitzoliver was introduced in Barry Letts' first Doctor Who radio play, The Paradise of Death and went on to appear in Letts' Past Doctor Adventure novel Island of Death.  He is also featured in the Past Doctor Adventures novel Instruments of Darkness.  Author Gary Russell originally intended Fitzoliver to be a part of the novel Business Unusual, but when BBC ordered it changed from a Third Doctor to a Sixth Doctor novel, the character was dropped.
The term "N-Space" (Null Space) here is used differently than it is during the E-Space trilogy, where it stands for "Normal Space."
Sarah Jane mentions encountering the Daleks, placing this story after Death to the Daleks.
The Doctor tells Sarah Jane a story about hiking around Gallifrey with a wise teacher who lived in the mountains.  This seems to be a reference to the Gallifreyan they encounter in Planet of the Spiders.

Cast and Crew Notes
Broadcast a few months before his death, this was Jon Pertwee's final performance as the Doctor.
Sandra Dickinson was married to Peter Davison (The Fifth Doctor).  Their daughter, Georgia Tennant, played Jenny in The Doctor's Daughter, and later married David Tennant, the Tenth Doctor.
Stephen Thorne appeared in The Dæmons, The Three Doctors, Frontier in Space and The Hand of Fear.
Harry Towb appeared in The Seeds of Death and Terror of the Autons.

In Print

Barry Letts' novelisation of the script was released as part of the Virgin Missing Adventures range of spin-off novels in 1995, nearly a year before the broadcast of the serial (the first BBC novelisation to not be published under the Target Books range, which had been retired the previous year).

References

External links

1995 British novels
1995 science fiction novels
1996 audio plays
1996 radio dramas
Third Doctor audio plays
Third Doctor novels
Virgin Missing Adventures
Radio plays based on Doctor Who
UNIT audio plays
Novels set in the 16th century
Novels set in the 19th century
British radio dramas
BBC Radio 2 programmes
BBC Radio dramas